A crush load is a level of passenger loading in a transport vehicle which is so high that passengers are "crushed" against one another. It represents an extreme form of passenger loading, and normally considered to be representative of a system with serious capacity limitations. Crush loads result from too many passengers within a vehicle designed for a much smaller number. Crush loaded trains or buses are so heavily loaded that for most passengers physical contact with several other nearby passengers is impossible to avoid.

Definition
In the context of transport economics and planning, crush load refers to the maximum level of passenger load for a particular vehicle or rail carriage. Crush loads are calculated for the number of passengers per unit area, standing up.

Crush loads are not an issue for passengers that are seated, as passengers will not normally sit on one another.

Crush loads are most common on city buses and rail metro systems, where passenger loading is high, and most passengers stand. Airlines almost never have crush loads, nor do high speed and/or long-distance rail or long-distance bus routes, where all passengers are generally seated.

Crush loads are normally measured using number of standing passengers per . Six passengers per square metre is often considered the practical limit on what can be accepted without serious discomfort to passengers. However, severe crush loads can be much in excess of this.

In India, the term "super dense crush load"  has been coined by railway officials to describe passenger loads on peak-hour trains operating on the Mumbai Suburban Railway when carriages built for 200 passengers carry over 500, translating to 14–16 people per square metre.

Effects
Crush loads in transport vehicles can result in many secondary issues, such as petty theft and pickpocketing, extreme discomfort for passengers, sexual harassment, and an inability for passengers to board and alight vehicles in a timely manner.

For a rail vehicle which has a crush load, passengers are touching and there is no space for another passenger to enter without causing serious discomfort to the passengers on board. According to Hoel et al. in Transportation Infrastructure Engineering, operating at crush load increases dwell time (the length of time the transport vehicle remains in the station or stop) and reduces overall vehicle capacity per unit of time.

Large dense concentrations of passengers can create dangerous  conditions, both within transit vehicles and at overcrowded stations. In 2014, a news service in Mumbai, India reported several serious platform gap mutilation incidents and a death within a few months, mostly attributed to crowded conditions.

See also

Passenger car (rail)

References

Transport economics
Transportation engineering
Land transport
Transportation planning
Types of bus service